NGC 1169 (UGC 2503) is an intermediate barred spiral galaxy in the constellation of Perseus.  NGC 1169 has a reddish center, indicating the region is dominated by older stars.  In contrast, the outer ring contains larger blue-white stars, a sign of recent star formation.  The entire galaxy is rotating at approximately 265 km/s.

NGC 1169 was discovered on December 11, 1786 by William Herschel.  Measurements of its distance range from 20.9 Mpc - 49.7 Mpc with an average of 35.1 Mpc.

References

External links 
 
 SIMBAD Astronomical Database
 NASA/IPAC Extragalactic Database
 Paper on NGC 1169 and NGC 3898

Perseus (constellation)
Intermediate spiral galaxies
1169
2503
11521